Sanjib Banerjee (born: 2 November 1961) is an Indian judge presently serving as the Chief Justice of Meghalaya High Court. He has previously served as the Chief Justice of Madras High Court and a Judge in Calcutta High Court.

Career
Banerjee did his schooling from St. Paul's School, Darjeeling and passed B.Sc. with Honors in Economics in 1983 and LL.B. in the year 1986-87 from University of Calcutta. Banerjee started his career as a sports journalist in The Telegraph. Banerjee was enrolled as an Advocate on 21 November 1990. He practiced in various High Courts. He was elevated as Permanent Judge of Calcutta High Court on 22 June 2006. He was appointed Chief Justice of Madras High Court on 31 December 2020 and took oath on 4 January 2021. He was transferred as Chief Justice of Meghalaya High Court on 15 November 2021 and took oath on 24 November 2021.

References 

1961 births
Living people
Indian judges
Judges of the Calcutta High Court
Chief Justices of the Madras High Court
University of Calcutta alumni
St. Paul's School, Darjeeling alumni
Chief Justices of the Meghalaya High Court